Thiruvalaputhur Swaminatha Pillai (died 13 March 1972) is a flute artist  from Tamil Nadu.

Early life 
T K Swaminatha Pillai was born as the first son of well-known dancer,  Tiruvalaputtur Kalyani Ammal. His family, which belongs to the Isai Vellalar community , hails from the Tiruvalaputur village in the Mayiladudurai taluk of the Tanjore district. Swaminatha Pillai has one younger brother and two younger sisters who were also Bharathanatyam dancers. The brother was a violinist. Thiruvalaputhur Krishnamoorthy Pillai was awarded Kalaimamani award from the tamil nadu state government. He accompanied vocalists like M.S.Subbulakshmi, N.C.Vasanthakokilam, Madurai Somu etc.,

Dancing career 
As a child, Pillai was from his young age interested in the Arts 
and turned his attention towards dance right from childhood . To learn Bharatanatyam, he became a disciple of the guru Panthanallur Meenakshi Sundaram Pillai, spending more than 12 years in his gurukulam. Along with his guru, he conducted several dance events and taught dance to several students. Later, he shifted to Chennai and joined Vazhuvur Ramaiyya Pillai as a dance teacher.

Family 
Swaminatha Pillai has only one son. He was involved in the Indian independence movement, but refused to accept the concessions meant for freedom fighters. He served as a Councilor of Kumbakonam for three consecutive times.

Disciples 
Pillai's dance students include Vazhuvur Samraj, L. Vijayalakshmi, Swamimalai Rajarathnam Pillai,  Hema Malini and Shripriya.

Awards and recognition 
Pillai received the Kalaimamani Award from the Tamil Nadu Government under the chief minister Annadurai. He also received the National Award from the President of India, V. V. Giri.

Indian male dancers
1972 deaths
Year of birth missing
Performers of Indian classical dance
Bharatanatyam exponents
Dancers from Tamil Nadu
Recipients of the Sangeet Natak Akademi Award